Rick Nuzum is a former center in the National Football League. He first played with the Los Angeles Rams during the 1977 NFL season. The following season, he played with the Green Bay Packers.
He graduated from Marietta High School, Marietta Ohio in 1971. He is currently the lead pastor at Grace Church in Powell, Ohio.

References

1952 births
Living people
Sportspeople from Charleston, West Virginia
Players of American football from West Virginia
Los Angeles Rams players
Green Bay Packers players
American football centers
Kentucky Wildcats football players